The Estadio Román Suárez Puerta is a multi-use stadium located in Avilés, Asturias, Spain. 
It is currently used for football matches and is the home stadium of Real Avilés.

The stadium has a capacity of 5,352 seats: 4,220 of them are in the two main tribunes and 1,232 in the uncovered stand.

History

Inaugurated with the name of Estadio La Exposición on 26 September 1943 with a match between Real Avilés and Real Santander, the stadium changed its name in homage of the mayor of Avilés who proposed its construction in 1956.

The stadium also hosted the Spanish Championship of Athletics between 1948 and 1952 and has been totally renovated in 1999.

On 28 December 2002, Estadio Román Suárez Puerta hosted the 5–2 win of the Asturian football team against Honduras, in front of a crowd of 7,000 people.

References

External links
Official website 
Estadios de España 

Football venues in Asturias
Sport in Avilés
Sports venues completed in 1943